Shirokuma Cafe is a 2012 Japanese anime television series produced by Studio Pierrot based on the manga series by Aloha Higa published in Shogakukan's Flowers magazine. The series revolves around various animals living casually amongst the humans, including a Polar Bear who runs a café, a lazy Panda and a cynical Penguin. The series aired on TV Tokyo between April 5, 2012 and March 28, 2013. The ending themes in order are "Bamboo☆Scramble" by Jun Fukuyama,  by Yuichi Nakamura,  by Aya Endo,  by Katsuyuki Konishi,  by Wataru Hatano,  by Hiroshi Kamiya,  by Toshiyuki Morikawa,  by Daisuke Ono,  by Kishō Taniyama,  by Kana Hanazawa, "PANDAHOLIC!!" by Tokuyoshi Kawashima and "My Dear" by Takahiro Sakurai.

Episode list

References

Shirokuma Cafe